Jack Harold Paar (May 1, 1918 – January 27, 2004) was an American talk show host, author, radio and television comedian, and film actor. He was the second host of The Tonight Show from 1957 to 1962. Time magazine's obituary of Paar reported wryly, "His fans would remember him as the fellow who split talk show history into two eras: Before Paar and Below Paar."

Early life and education
Paar was born in 1918 in Canton, Ohio, the son of Lillian M. (Hein) and Howard Paar. As a child, he developed a stutter, which he learned to manage. He contracted tuberculosis when he was 14 and left school at 16.

Career

Early career
He first worked near home as a radio announcer at WIBM in Jackson, Michigan.  As a radio announcer he was known to stop by the newspaper stand in front of the Jackson Citizen Patriot and pick up a freshly published copy of that local newspaper before going on to work where he would read from the news copy.  The staff of the Citizen Patriot was somewhat perturbed by his verbatim reading of their work product and, on April 1st of one year, printed a special edition of the paper for him only and placed it in the stand where they knew he would pick it up before going to work.  It mentioned that an Arabian potentate named "Loof Lirpa" would be paying a formal visit to the town later that day.  The newspaper staff had a bit of revenge when he read that column on air and later had egg on his face when it turned out that Loof Lirpa was, in fact, "April Fool" in reverse.  Paar went on to working as a humorous disc jockey at other Midwest stations, including WJR in Detroit, WIRE in Indianapolis, WGAR in Cleveland, and WBEN in Buffalo. In his book P.S. Jack Paar, he recalled doing utility duty at WGAR in 1938 when Orson Welles broadcast his famous simulated alien invasion, The War of the Worlds, over the CBS network (and its WGAR affiliate). Attempting to calm possibly panicked listeners, Paar announced, "The world is not coming to an end. Trust me. When have I ever lied to you?"

Paar was drafted into the Army in 1943 during World War II, interrupting his tenure as host of WBEN's morning show The Sun Greeter's Club. He was assigned to the U.S.O. in the South Pacific to entertain the troops. Paar was a clever, wisecracking master of ceremonies; he narrowly escaped being disciplined when he impersonated senior officers, especially Col. Ralph Parr.

Radio and films

After World War II, Paar opted not to return to WBEN, instead seeking opportunities in network radio and film. He worked in radio as a fill-in on The Breakfast Club show and appeared as a host of Take It or Leave It, a show with a top prize of $64. He got his big break when Jack Benny, who had been impressed by Paar's U.S.O. performances, suggested that Paar serve as his 1947 summer replacement. Paar was enough of a hit on Benny's show that Benny's sponsor, the American Tobacco Company, decided to keep him on the air, moving him to ABC for the fall season. Paar later refused American Tobacco's suggestion that he come up with a weekly running gag or gimmick, saying he "wanted to get away from that kind of old-hat comedy, the kind being practiced by Jack Benny and Fred Allen." The show was then terminated, earning Paar the enduring image of "a spoiled kid". A profile of Paar by the Museum of Broadcast Communications suggests that Paar later emulated Benny's mannerisms.

Paar signed as a contract player for Howard Hughes' RKO studio in the immediate postwar period, appearing as the emcee in Variety Time (1948), a low-budget compilation of vaudeville sketches. He later recalled that RKO producers had trouble figuring out what kind of screen characters he could play until one of the executives dubbed him, "Kay Kyser [bandleader who had made films for RKO], with warmth." Another compared his leading man appearance with Alan Ladd. Paar projected a pleasant personality on film, and RKO called him back to emcee another filmed vaudeville show, Footlight Varieties (1951). He also appeared in the 1950 film  Walk Softly, Stranger, starring Joseph Cotten. In 1951, he played Marilyn Monroe's boyfriend in the 20th Century Fox film Love Nest.

Paar returned to radio in 1950, hosting The $64 Question for one season, then quitting in a wage dispute after the show's sponsor pulled out and NBC insisted everyone involved take a pay cut. In 1956, he gave radio one more try, hosting a disc jockey effort on ABC called The Jack Paar Show.  Paar once described that show as "so modest we did it from the basement rumpus room of our house in Bronxville."

Television
Paar got his first taste of television in the early 1950s, appearing as a comic on The Ed Sullivan Show and hosting two game shows, Up To Paar (1952) and Bank on the Stars (1953), before hosting The Morning Show (1954) on CBS. He had The Jack Paar Show on CBS, a Monday-Friday 1-1:30 p.m. Eastern Time program that ended on in May 1956. Paar guest-starred twice in 1958 on Polly Bergen's short-lived NBC comedy/variety show, The Polly Bergen Show.

The Tonight Show

With the success of Steve Allen as the first host of The Tonight Show, NBC gave him his own primetime variety hour in June 1956. Over the next seven months, Allen's Tonight duties were limited to three nights a week, with Ernie Kovacs filling in on Mondays and Tuesdays. Allen's heavy workload compelled Allen to leave Tonight in January 1957 and concentrate on his primetime show. For the next six months, NBC revamped the program as Tonight! America After Dark, inspired by the network's Today. The new late-night offering was a magazine show with different hosts in different cities, and was a huge, embarrassing failure. The network soon returned to its proven formula by reviving Tonight and hiring Jack Paar. With Paar as host, the show became a ratings success and would generate annual advertising sales of up to $15 million. The show was initially titled Tonight Starring Jack Paar; after 1959, it was officially known as The Jack Paar Show.

Paar often was unpredictable, emotional, and principled. When network censors cut a joke about a "water closet" (a term used for a toilet) from the show's February 10, 1960, broadcast tape before airtime without warning, Paar received national attention by walking off the program the following evening in protest, leaving announcer Hugh Downs to finish the show. Paar did not return until three weeks later, after the network apologized and he was allowed to tell the joke. Paar's emotional nature made the everyday routine of putting together a 105-minute program difficult to continue for more than five years. As a TV Guide item put it, he was "bone tired" of the grind, although he later confided to interviewer Dick Cavett that leaving the program was the greatest mistake of his life. He signed off the show for the last time on March 29, 1962, spending much of that final program ripping his enemies in the press, notably gossip columnists Walter Winchell and Dorothy Kilgallen.

Near the end of the run of the show, Abel Green of Variety called him "the most vivid personality in TV since Milton Berle became Mister Television" and said that he was the first popular entertainer since Amos 'n' Andy to change the habits of a nation, influencing sales of TV sets for the bedroom. Green also claimed that Paar had created more stars than Major Bowes. However, in a 1972 appearance on The Dick Cavett Show, he jokingly told the audience, "I wasn't very good, otherwise you wouldn't be here."

Prime time
Because NBC did not want to lose Paar to another network, it offered him a Friday primetime hour, giving him carte blanche on content and format. He agreed, deciding on a variation of his late-night format and titling the show The Jack Paar Program. The show, which debuted in the fall of 1962, had a global perspective, debuting acts from around the world and showing films from exotic locations. Most of the films were of travels by guests such as Arthur Godfrey or Paar himself, including visits with Albert Schweitzer at his compound in Gabon in Central Africa, and Mary Martin at her home in the jungles of Brazil.

Paar showed film clips of The Beatles performing, one month before their famous live appearance on The Ed Sullivan Show.

During the first half of 1964, a mock feud pitted Paar against his lead-in program, Englishman David Frost's news-satire series That Was The Week That Was ("TW3"). A typical exchange would have TW3 "signing off" the NBC Television Network just before the Paar program, with Paar responding that the show immediately preceding his was "Henry Morgan's Amateur Hour" (Morgan was a frequent guest on "TW3"). The feud suddenly evaporated when NBC moved "TW3" to a different time slot.

Paar's primetime show aired for three years, including a wide variety of guests such as comedian Brother Dave Gardner, actor-director Peter Ustinov, actor Richard Burton, pianist-actor Oscar Levant, news icon  Lowell Thomas, boxing champion Muhammad Ali reciting his poetry to piano accompaniment by Liberace, Judy Garland, Jonathan Winters, Woody Allen, Bill Cosby (whose nickname for Paar was "The Boss"), Bette Davis, Robert Morley, Cliff Arquette (as his Charley Weaver character), Dick Gregory, Lawrence of Arabia's brother, and many others. The final segment of the series, broadcast on June 25, 1965, featured Paar sitting alone on a stool, sharing a discussion that he had with his daughter Randy, who called Paar's departure a sabbatical. He said that his own field was, though not completely used up, "a little dry recently." Then he called to Leica, his German Shepherd, which came to him from the seats of what was, for once, an empty studio, and walked out.  (Johnny Carson used the same format, sans dog, for his own farewell episode of The Tonight Show in 1992.)

Decades later, Garry Shandling featured the clip of Paar's farewell in the series finale of The Larry Sanders Show in 1998, in a sequence showing Larry studying final episodes of late night shows to prepare for his own final episode.

Paar continued to appear in occasional specials for the network until 1970.

Later career

In the late 1960s, Paar lived in Maine where he owned and operated television station WMTW, an ABC network affiliate in Poland Spring, Maine.
  
Paar returned to television with a show in January 1973, on Jack Paar Tonite, which aired one week per month as one of several rotating shows on ABC's Wide World of Entertainment. Paar said it was the most he was willing to appear, and that he would not have appeared at all unless ABC had committed to keeping Dick Cavett, one of his former writers, on the air. Paar's announcer for this program was comic actress Peggy Cass. Perhaps its most memorable events were the national television debuts, on separate evenings, of comics Freddie Prinze and Martin Mull. Paar stayed on the show, which was in direct competition with Tonight, for one year before quitting. Dissatisfied with the rotation scheme, he complained that even his own mother didn't know when he was on. Paar later expressed discomfort with developments in television media and once said he had trouble interviewing people dressed in "overalls", a reference to young rock acts.

In the 1980s and 1990s, Paar made rare guest appearances on Donahue, The Tonight Show (hosted by Johnny Carson, then Jay Leno), and Late Night with David Letterman, as well as on Charles Grodin's CNBC talk show. In his appearance on Letterman, which taped across the hall from Studio 6B, Paar took the host into a dressing room with a closet where Jim Henson and his puppeteers had painted artwork on a set of pipes some 20 years earlier while waiting to appear on Paar's program. The artwork remained intact and NBC has since preserved the pipes for inclusion on the studio tour.

He participated in the 1987 TV retrospective show "This Is Your Life" honoring Betty White, sharing an anecdote about trying to fix her up with someone before she met Allen Ludden.

Criticism of homosexuality
In his 1962 book, My Saber is Bent, Paar wrote in a chapter titled "Fairies and Communists", "There used to be a time when it looked like the Communists were taking over show business. Now it's fairies. They operate a lot alike, actually; both have a tendency to colonize. Just as there used to be no such thing as one Communist in a play or movie, now there is no such thing as one fairy. Where you find one, you usually find a baker's dozen swishing around.... When I hear that some fairy is producing or directing or acting in a play, I can often name some of the rest of the cast, even if I've never heard it... The poor darlings, as they sometimes call themselves, are everywhere in show business. The theater is infested with them and it's beginning to show the effects. 'The New York theater is dying,' the late Ernie Kovacs complained recently, 'Killed by limp wrists.'"  In addition to criticizing gay men in theater and film, Paar also criticized gay men in the fashion industry: "I hope that all red-blooded men will rally to my crusade to have girls look like girls again. If we show our determination I'm sure that women will throw off the tyranny of fairy designers."

In March 1973, during the run of Jack Paar Tonite, following protests from members of Gay Activists Alliance, Paar apologized for his anti-gay remarks and invited representatives of the organization on the show to explain why he "and other entertainers should not call homosexuals 'fairies,' 'dykes' and 'fags.'"

Reflecting on the controversy, Jonathan Winters, who had been a frequent guest of Paar's, asked Dick Cavett: "Dick, did you ever think that Jack was maybe deep in the closet?”

Retrospectives

In 1984, Paar came out of retirement once again for the Museum of Broadcasting's "Tribute to Jack Paar", produced by Kevin Doherty, making two live appearances in New York. This led to his 1986 NBC special Jack Paar Comes Home. The following year, a second special, Jack Paar Is Alive and Well, was broadcast by the network. Both were made up largely of black-and-white kinescoped clips used at the tribute from Tonight and from Paar's primetime program, to which he maintained the copyright. Although most of Paar's Tonight Shows were taped (in color from 1960), only a few moments are known to exist in this format.

In 1997, PBS television devoted an edition of the American Masters series to Paar's career, and in 2003 revisited the topic with another hour-long examination of his work, titled Smart Television.

In the spring of 2004, a memorial for Paar was held at the Museum of Television and Radio in New York City. Ron Simon, one of the museum's television and radio curators, was host and moderator, with appearances and speeches by television talk show host Dick Cavett, Turner Classic Movies (TCM) television host Robert Osborne, and Paar's daughter, Randy.

Awards
Paar was nominated for an Emmy award for Best Performance by a Continuing Character in a Musical or Variety Series in 1951, and nominated again in 1958 for an Emmy for Best Continuing Performance in a Series by a Comedian, Singer, Host, Dancer, M.C., Announcer, Narrator, or Panelist. He did not win either time.

Personal life and death
Paar was married twice to his first wife, Irene Paar (née Gubbins). After divorcing, the couple remarried in 1940 in Ohio, only to divorce again. He then married his second wife, Miriam Wagner, in 1943, and they remained together until his death.

During the 1990s, Paar's health began to decline steadily. He had triple-bypass heart surgery in 1998 and suffered a stroke in 2003. The following year he died at his home in Greenwich, Connecticut, with Miriam and their daughter Randy at his bedside. Paar's body was cremated, and his ashes returned to his family.

Bibliography
 introduction by Jack Paar.

References

External links

1918 births
2004 deaths
20th-century American comedians
American male comedians
American game show hosts
American television talk show hosts
Comedians from Ohio
Late night television talk show hosts
Military personnel from Ohio
People from Jackson, Michigan
Radio personalities from Buffalo, New York
Radio personalities from Detroit
RCA Victor artists
The Tonight Show
Writers from Canton, Ohio
Writers from Greenwich, Connecticut
United States Army personnel of World War II
United States Army soldiers